Bodonci is a village in the Municipality of Puconci in the Prekmurje region of Slovenia.

There is a large Lutheran church named after István Küzmics (Števan Küzmič) in the settlement. The original church was a wooden structure built in 1792. In 1800 this was replaced by a more solid structure, but the current church was built on the same site in 1899, based on the plans by the architect Daniel Placotta from Budapest and is a typical example of a church with a central nave and two side aisles with a gallery and tall narrow windows.

Notable people
Notable people that were born or lived in Bodonci include:
Iván Fliszár
István Szmodis (1758–?), writer

References

External links 

Bodonci on Geopedia
Evangelical Lutheran church in Bodonci site

Populated places in the Municipality of Puconci